DKA is diabetic ketoacidosis, a potentially life-threatening complication of diabetes mellitus.

DKA may also refer to:

 Katsina Airport (IATA code), Nigeria
 Delta Kappa Alpha, a professional cinema fraternity at the University of Southern California, US
 Dan Kearney and Associates, a fictional private investigation firm in the work of Joe Gores